Diphlebia coerulescens, known as the sapphire rockmaster, is an Australian species of broad winged damselfly.
It is one of a group known as the azure damselflies. It is found in Queensland and north-eastern New South Wales in eastern Australia, where it is found in fast-flowing streams and rivers.

English-born entomologist, Robin Tillyard described the sapphire rockmaster as a subspecies of the tropical rockmaster, Diphlebia euphaeoides in 1913, before reassessing it as a separate species on the basis of the distinct shape of the male anal appendage, as well as differences in size and colour of the adults.

The male sapphire rockmaster has a mostly bright blue and black body with dark wings. It can be distinguished from the tropical rockmaster by the larger size of two prominent blue markings at the base (front end) and underside of terga 4 to 6. Its upperside abdomen of its otherwise black abdomen often has blue markings to the front ends of the terga. The wings are narrower than the tropical rockmaster, but wider than the other members of the genus, and are a smoky brown rather than black. The legs are mostly brownish black, but have some blue on the upper mid and hind femurs. The female sapphire rockmaster is predominantly brown and olive-green, and also has smoky-coloured wings. Its legs are dark brown with light brown upper segments of mid and hind femurs. The upperside of its abdomen is a dark olive-green, with a darker dorsal line prominently running down the midline, which widens into a roughly triangular pattern at the rear end of each segment (tergum).

Gallery

References 

Lestoideidae
Odonata of Australia
Insects of Australia
Endemic fauna of Australia
Taxa named by Robert John Tillyard
Insects described in 1913
Damselflies